Tegeticula yuccasella, the yucca moth, is a moth of the family Prodoxidae. The species was first described by Charles Valentine Riley in 1872. It can be found in North America from Texas to southern Canada.

The wingspan is 18–27 mm. The forewings are wide and blunt, usually white but occasionally with more or less tan. The hindwings are medium to light brownish gray.

The larvae feed on Yucca filamentosa, Yucca smalliana, Yucca flaccida, Yucca glauca, Yucca arkansana, Yucca constricta, Yucca rupicola, Yucca pallida, Yucca reverchoni and Yucca aloifolia. They feed on developing seeds. Pupation takes place in a cocoon in the soil.

References

External links

Pellmyr, Olle "Keys to species of the Tegeticula yuccasella complex". Tree of Life Web Project. Retrieved November 11, 2020.

Moths described in 1872
Prodoxidae